Bambili-Dingila Airport  is an airstrip serving the towns of Bambili and Dingila in Bas-Uélé Province, Democratic Republic of the Congo.

See also

Transport in the Democratic Republic of the Congo
List of airports in the Democratic Republic of the Congo

References

External links
 OpenStreetMap - Bambili-Dingila Airport
 OurAirports - Bambili-Dingila Airport
 FallingRain - Bambili-Dingila Airport
 

Airports in Bas-Uélé Province